Eric Enrique Vásquez Martínez (born 8 January 1988) is a football defender who currently plays for Costa del Este.

Club career
He joined San Francisco in summer 2013 from Chorrillo. Earlier he had a loan spell abroad with Mexican third division side Cuervos Negros.

International career
He was part of the Panama U-20 squad that participated in the 2007 FIFA World Youth Cup in Canada.

Vásquez made his senior debut for Panama in an August 2007 friendly match against Guatemala and has, as of August 2015, earned a total of 10 caps, scoring no goals. He has represented his country in 1 FIFA World Cup qualification matches.

References

External links

1988 births
Living people
Sportspeople from Panama City
Association football defenders
Panamanian footballers
Panama international footballers
2013 Copa Centroamericana players
Unión Deportivo Universitario players
San Francisco F.C. players
Panamanian expatriate footballers
Expatriate footballers in Mexico
Panama under-20 international footballers